Yangsan Sports Complex station is an under-construction railway station on Busan Metro Line 2 and Yangsan Metro of the Busan Metro system.

References

Railway stations scheduled to open in 2024
Metro stations in Yangsan